Geoffrey Graham Dow (born 4 July 1942) is a retired British Anglican bishop. He was the Bishop of Carlisle from 2000 to 2009, the 66th holder of the office. He is a well-known Evangelical.

Early life
Born in 1942, in Edmonton, London, Dow was educated at St Albans School and The Queen's College, Oxford.

Religious appointments
Before his arrival in Carlisle, Dow was the vicar of Holy Trinity Church, Coventry prior to his appointment as Bishop of Willesden (an area bishopric in the Diocese of London) in 1992. He was consecrated as bishop on 22 May 1992 at St Paul's Cathedral, by George Carey, Archbishop of Canterbury.

Dow was made the Bishop of Carlisle in 2000 and retired from this position at the end of April 2009.

Position and statements
Dow was one of the rebel bishops who signed a letter against Rowan Williams' decision not to block the appointment of Jeffrey John as Bishop of Reading in 2003. The other diocesan bishop signatories (referred to, since there were nine, as the Nazgûl) were: Michael Scott-Joynt (Bishop of Winchester), Michael Langrish (Exeter), Michael Nazir-Ali (Rochester), Peter Forster (Chester), James Jones (Liverpool), George Cassidy (Southwell & Nottingham), John Hind (Chichester) and David James (Bradford).

In 2005, Dow attracted media attention when he said that a stone in Carlisle inscribed with a 16th-century curse should be removed. The curse was pronounced on the Border Reivers by the Archbishop of Glasgow and was inscribed on a stone as part of the city's millennium celebrations. Subsequently, some Carlisle residents blamed disasters, such as an outbreak of foot-and-mouth disease, flooding and the relegation of the local football team from its league on the presence of the stone. Dow stated that "The original curse was not a godly act. For this reason I have always said that it would be better if the stone were not there" and said he intended to ask the current archbishop of Glasgow, Mario Conti, to come to Carlisle and perform a blessing to remove the curse.

Dow's activities have included giving a blessing at the launch of HMS Astute in Barrow-in-Furness on 8 June 2007.

Natural disasters as divine retribution

In July 2007, following widespread storms over parts of the United Kingdom, Dow stated that he believed the resulting flooding (in which several people were killed) was an act of divine retribution, the result of God's "strong and definite judgement" on the "moral degradation" of British society. In particular, he blamed the economic exploitation of poorer nations and the United Kingdom's introduction of laws aimed at reducing discrimination against gay people, notably the proposals to introduce same-sex marriage. He stated that "the Sexual Orientation Regulations are part of a general scene of permissiveness. We are in a situation where we are liable for God's judgement."

According to an article in The Times, Dow is a specialist in exorcism, explaining in a leaflet entitled Explaining Deliverance that "There is a view that both oral and anal sexual practice is liable to allow entry to spirits."

Personal life
Dow is married to Molly and they have four adult children.

References

External links
Diocese of Carlisle website

People educated at St Albans School, Hertfordshire
21st-century Church of England bishops
Alumni of The Queen's College, Oxford
Bishops of Carlisle
Bishops of Willesden
Evangelical Anglican bishops
1942 births
Living people
Staff of St John's College, Nottingham